David Frederick Washington (born August 20, 1978), who goes by the stage name Freddie Bruno, is an American Christian hip hop musician and member of the hip hop collective, Deepspace5. He has released two noteworthy studio albums, The Ballpoint Composer in 2002 on Uprok Records, and Hold Music on Illect Recordings, in 2007.

Early and personal life
Washington was born David Frederick Washington on August 20, 1978, in Washington, D.C., where he was raised. His family members are musicians in their own right, his mother is a singer, father is a drummer, and sister is a French horn player. He moved to Dallas, Texas, where his music career began. He got married on April 9, 1999, in Dallas, Texas, to Christina Lisann Kelm.

Music career
His music career began with the Christian hip hop collective, Deepspace5, in 1997. He started his solo music recording career with the studio album, The Ballpoint Composer, released on April 11, 2002, by Uprok Records. He released Hold Music, a second studio album, on May 6, 2007, through Illect Recordings.

Discography
Studio albums
 Hold Music  (May 6, 2007, Illect)

References

External links
 Holy Hip Hop DataBase profile

1978 births
Living people
African-American male rappers
African-American Christians
Musicians from Dallas
Musicians from Washington, D.C.
American performers of Christian hip hop music
Rappers from Dallas
Rappers from Washington, D.C.
Deepspace5 members
Tooth & Nail Records artists
American hip hop record producers
21st-century American rappers
Record producers from Texas